Angeli Vanlaanen (born October 24, 1985) is an American  freestyle skier. She competed at the 2014 Winter Olympics in Sochi, Russia.

In November 2009, she was diagnosed with Lyme disease.

References

External links 
 
 
 
 
 

1985 births
Living people
American female freestyle skiers
Olympic freestyle skiers of the United States
Freestyle skiers at the 2014 Winter Olympics
Sportspeople from Bellingham, Washington
Waldorf school alumni